Myakinnaya is a rural locality (a village) in Yenangskoye Rural Settlement, Kichmengsko-Gorodetsky District, Vologda Oblast, Russia. The population was 36 as of 2002.

Geography 
Myakinnaya is located 67 km east of Kichmengsky Gorodok (the district's administrative centre) by road. Titovshchina is the nearest rural locality.

References 

Rural localities in Kichmengsko-Gorodetsky District